The 21st century of the Christian or Common Era, which runs from 2001 through 2100.

21st century may also refer to:

Media 
 Twenty-First Century, a Hong Kong intellectual journal influential in China during the early 1990s
 The 21st Century, an American television news show hosted by Walter Cronkite, originally called The 20th Century
  21st Century Fox, an American mass-media conglomerate acquired by Disney

Music 
 21st Century (Blue System album), 1994
 21st Century (Groove Coverage album), 2006
 21st Century, an album by Lincoln Thompson, 1997
 "21st Century (Digital Boy)", a song by Bad Religion, 1990
 "21st Century", a song by Red Hot Chili Peppers from Stadium Arcadium, 2006
 "21st Century Boy", a song by Sigue Sigue Sputnik, 1986

Business 
 21st Century Network (21CN), a networking project by BT Group plc
 21st Century Insurance, a subsidiary of Farmers Insurance Group

See also 
 21st century BC
 Century 21 (disambiguation)
 Siglo XXI (disambiguation)